Hedwick Wilhelmina McDonald (28 April 1893 – 5 October 1959) was a New Zealand racehorse trainer. She was born in Hastings, Hawke's Bay, New Zealand on 28 April 1893.

She was the trainer of the 1938 Melbourne Cup winner Catalogue. Whilst she was a registered horse trainer in New Zealand, women were not then allowed to register as horse trainers in Australia. So Catalogue was entered into the Melbourne Cup with Hedwick's husband Allan as the registered trainer.

References

1893 births
1959 deaths
Sportspeople from Hastings, New Zealand
New Zealand racehorse trainers